Windward High School is the newest of two public high schools of the Ferndale School District (district 502), in Bellingham, Washington. Windward is part of the Small Schools Project, funded in part by a grant from the Gates Foundation, which seeks to establish small intimate learning environments within communities.

Windward offers courses in Science, Math, English, Social Studies, Spanish, Japanese, Technology, Fine Arts, Performing Arts and Physical Education.  With a very low student-to-teacher ratio, and a project-based education model, each course emphasizes collaboration among students and with faculty in a team-approach.  The school does not offer sports or many after-school extra-curricular activities; instead its students frequently participate in these functions at the nearby affiliated Ferndale High School. There are several after-school clubs run by teachers, including a Tech Club which fixes and donates old computers.

Due to financial reasons, the district shut down Windward High school at the end of the 2017–2018 school year. The last day was June 15, 2018.

See also 
 Small schools movement

References

External links
Official school website

High schools in Whatcom County, Washington
Public high schools in Washington (state)
Educational institutions established in 2004
2004 establishments in Washington (state)
Schools in Bellingham, Washington